The Cape-Atlantic League (CAL) is an athletic conference consisting of both public high schools and non-public high schools located in Atlantic County, Cape May County, Cumberland County, and Gloucester County, New Jersey. The Cape-Atlantic League operates under the aegis of the New Jersey State Interscholastic Athletic Association. It was first established in 1949, and today it comprises twenty-two schools, divided into anywhere from one to four divisions, depending on sport. All schools that sponsor a football program are members of the West Jersey Football League.

History
Hammonton High School, which was one of the conference's original members when it was established in 1949, had been a member of the Tri-County Conference from 2014 to 2020, before returning to the Cape-Atlantic League for the 2020-21 school year.

Participating schools

Footnotes

External links 
CAL League website
South Jersey Sports high school list

1949 establishments in New Jersey
Sports in Atlantic County, New Jersey
Sports in Cape May County, New Jersey
Cumberland County, New Jersey
Sports in Gloucester County, New Jersey
High school sports conferences and leagues in the United States
New Jersey high school athletic conferences